Raman Ivanavich Piatrushenka or Roman Petrushenko (born 25 December 1980) is a Belarusian sprint canoeist  who has competed since 2000. Competing in three Summer Olympics, he won four medals with one gold (K-4 1000 m: 2008), one silver (K-2 200m: 2012) and two bronzes (K-2 500 m: 2004, 2008).

Piatrushenka's first success on the international stage came at the 2000 European under-23 Championships in Boulogne, France as a member of the Belarus K-4 crew which won both the 500 m and 1000 m gold medals.

At the 2001 European championships in Milan he was persuaded to enter the K-4 races, winning his first senior medals – the 500 m and 1000 m bronze. In the K-1 1000m however, he could only finish 17th.

At the 2002 European under-23 Championships in Zagreb he won the K-1 1000 m gold medal, as well as retaining both K-4 titles. Having rejoined the senior K-4 crew on a permanent basis he won his first world championship medal, the K-4 1000 m silver, in Seville. Senior K-1 races were proving harder though and he again failed to reach any major finals in 2002.

Realising he was not yet ready to challenge for senior K-1 medals he instead teamed up with Vadzim Makhneu to compete in K-2 races. On their first World Cup outing in Szeged in May 2003 they beat a world-class field including Germans Rauhe and Wieskötter over 500 m. At the 2003 World Championships in Gainesville, USA, they claimed the silver medal.

In 2004 at the Athens Olympics they won the K-2 500 m bronze medal.

In 2005 they took a break from the K-2 (and each other). Meanwhile, the Belarusian four, with Piatrushenka as the "engine", established themselves as the top K-4 500m crew in the world. A gold medal at the European Championships in Poznań was followed by victory in the World Championship final in Zagreb. This was Belarus's first world championship team kayak gold medal since independence. He also won nine more medals at the ICF Canoe Sprint World Championships with six gold (K-2 200 m: 2007, 2009; K-2 500 m: 2009, 2010; K-4 200 m: 2009, K-4 1000 m: 2009), two silvers (K-2 500 m: 2007, K-4 1000 m: 2010), and a bronze (K-4 1000 m: 2006).

In June 2015, he competed in the inaugural European Games, for Belarus in canoe sprint, more specifically, Men's K-2 1000m with Vitaliy Bialko and K-4 1000m with Pavel Miadzvedzeu, Aleh Yurenia, and Vitaliy Bialko. He earned bronze medals in both areas.

References
 Canoe09.ca profile

External links
 
 

1980 births
People from Kalinkavichy District
Belarusian male canoeists
Canoeists at the 2004 Summer Olympics
Canoeists at the 2008 Summer Olympics
Canoeists at the 2012 Summer Olympics
Living people
Olympic canoeists of Belarus
Olympic gold medalists for Belarus
Olympic bronze medalists for Belarus
Olympic medalists in canoeing
Olympic silver medalists for Belarus
ICF Canoe Sprint World Championships medalists in kayak
Medalists at the 2012 Summer Olympics
Medalists at the 2008 Summer Olympics
Medalists at the 2004 Summer Olympics
European Games medalists in canoeing
Canoeists at the 2015 European Games
European Games bronze medalists for Belarus
Canoeists at the 2019 European Games
Sportspeople from Gomel Region